Sangi may refer to:
 Sangi (surname)
 Sangi Railway, a Japanese railway company
 Sangi (film), a 2003 Indian Bengali film.
 Sangi (Japan), the Japanese Imperial Council
 a spelling variant of Sangir